Churn railway station was a station on the Didcot, Newbury and Southampton Railway in England. It served Churn Down, a remote part of the Berkshire Downs. The nearest village was Blewbury, two miles north, which was already served by Upton and Blewbury railway station, the previous station on the line.

History
This was a small and very isolated single platform halt with access only via an unmetalled downland sheep road. It was built as a temporary stop to accommodate a competition held by the National Rifle Association in 1888. However, from 1889 military summer camps were established near to the station which required the use of the halt as the only access to the site. Timetables provided that trains would not call at Churn unless prior notice had been given to the Stationmaster at Didcot.

Facilities
The station buildings consisted of no more than a simple wooden shelter and basic lavatories. In order to provide deliveries of goods for the camps a small siding was built at the southern end of the station.

In fiction
In 1905 it was the subject of a fictional crime mystery, Sir Gilbert Murrell's Picture, part of Thrilling Stories of the Railways by Victor Whitechurch (1905)

Closure
The station closed in 1962 when the entire line was closed to passenger traffic. Freight operations ceased in 1966.

Routes

References 

Disused railway stations in Oxfordshire
Former Great Western Railway stations
Railway stations in Great Britain opened in 1888
Railway stations in Great Britain closed in 1942
Railway stations in Great Britain opened in 1943
Railway stations in Great Britain closed in 1962